This is a District-wise list of schools in the Indian state of Rajasthan.

Ajmer district

Bikaner district

Chittorgarh district

Jaipur district

Jhunjhunu district

Jodhpur district

Pali district

Udaipur district

Others 

Schools
Rajasthan